Tyree Stone Tavern, also known as the Old Stone House, is a historic inn and tavern located near Clifftop, Fayette County, West Virginia. It was built in 1824, and is a two-story fieldstone building.  It measures approximately 40 feet long and 30 feet deep. It served as a stage coach stop on the James River and Kanawha Turnpike.

It was listed on the National Register of Historic Places in 1975.

References

Hotel buildings on the National Register of Historic Places in West Virginia
Commercial buildings completed in 1824
Hotel buildings completed in 1824
Buildings and structures in Fayette County, West Virginia
National Register of Historic Places in Fayette County, West Virginia
Drinking establishments on the National Register of Historic Places in West Virginia